American Body Shop is an American sitcom that aired on Comedy Central from July 8 until September 19, 2007 that revolves around a dysfunctional body shop in suburban Phoenix, Arizona and the accident-prone crew that works there.

The show came to Comedy Central after its creator, Sam Greene, shot the pilot on his own, put it on a DVD and mailed it to "the networks".

After only one season, the show was canceled.

Cast
 Frank Merino as Luis
 Jill Bartlett as Denise
 Nick Offerman as Rob
 John DiResta as Johnny
 Peter Hulne as Sam
 Tim Nichols as Tim

Episodes

References

"Strapped to the Chassis for Maximal Yuks", The New York Times, July 6, 2007

External links
 

Comedy Central original programming
2000s American single-camera sitcoms
2000s American workplace comedy television series
2007 American television series debuts
2007 American television series endings
English-language television shows
Improvisational television series
Television shows set in Phoenix, Arizona